Ted Zigmunt is a former Democratic Party member of the Wisconsin State Assembly, representing the 2nd Assembly District after defeating incumbent Frank Lasee in the November 2008 election. He served as a member of the committees on Corrections and the Courts, Transportation, and Energy and Utilities. On November 2, 2010, Zigmunt was defeated by Republican nominee Andre Jacque.

He currently serves as the Village President of Francis Creek, Wisconsin.

References

External links
 
Follow the Money - Ted Zigmunt
2008 2006 campaign contributions
Ted Zigmunt campaign contributions at Wisconsin Democracy Campaign

Democratic Party members of the Wisconsin State Assembly
Living people
1951 births
21st-century American politicians